Chepang may refer to:
Chepang people, a group indigenous to the lands of Nepal
Chepang language, the language of the Chepang people